Impi Brecher Visser (born ) is a South African rugby sevens player for the South Africa national team in the World Rugby Sevens Series. In sevens he usually plays as a forward, but is a centre in fifteen-a-side rugby.

Biography 

"Impi", a zulu word, meaning a group of warriors, is not a nickname, but his given name. He has a degree in mechanical engineering.

In 2022, He was part of the South African team that won their second Commonwealth Games gold medal in Birmingham.

References

South African rugby union players
Living people
1995 births
Rugby union players from Pretoria
Rugby union centres
South Africa international rugby sevens players
Rugby sevens players at the 2020 Summer Olympics
Olympic rugby sevens players of South Africa
Rugby sevens players at the 2022 Commonwealth Games
Commonwealth Games gold medallists for South Africa
Commonwealth Games medallists in rugby sevens
Medallists at the 2022 Commonwealth Games